The Gwynne-Evans, later Evans-Tipping Baronetcy, of Oaklands Park in Awre in the County of Gloucester, is a title in the Baronetage of the United Kingdom. It was created on 17 June 1913 for William Gwynne-Evans. He received Royal licence to continue the use of the additional surname of Gwynne (which was that of his maternal grandfather) in 1913. The second Baronet served as high sheriff of Gloucestershire in 1943. The fourth Baronet assumed by deed poll the names of Francis Loring Gwynne Evans-Tipping in lieu of those of Francis Loring Gwynne-Evans in 1943 but resumed his patronymic of Gwynne-Evans by deed poll in 1958. The fifth Baronet uses the surname Evans-Tipping. However, he does not use his title.

Gwynne-Evans, later Evans-Tipping baronets, of Oaklands Park (1913)
Sir William Gwynne-Evans, 1st Baronet (1845–1927)
Sir Evan Gwynne Gwynne-Evans, 2nd Baronet (1877–1959)
Sir Ian William Gwynne-Evans, 3rd Baronet (1909–1985)
Sir Francis Loring Gwynne-Evans, 4th Baronet (1914–1993)
(Sir) David Gwynne Evans-Tipping, 5th Baronet (born 1943)

The heir presumptive is the current holder's nephew, Guy Edward Francis Evans-Tipping (born 1978).

Notes

References
Kidd, Charles, Williamson, David (editors). Debrett's Peerage and Baronetage (1990 edition). New York: St Martin's Press, 1990, 

Evans-Tipping